The 2000 Big East men's basketball tournament took place at Madison Square Garden in New York City. Its winner received the Big East Conference's automatic bid to the 2000 NCAA tournament. It is a single-elimination tournament with four rounds and the three highest seeds received byes in the first round. All 13 Big East teams were invited to participate. Syracuse finished with the best record in the regular season and was awarded the top seed.

St. John's defeated Connecticut in the final, 80–70 to earn its first Big East tournament championship since 1986, and third overall.

Bracket

Awards
Dave Gavitt Trophy (Most Outstanding Player): Bootsy Thornton, St. John's

All-Tournament Team
 Erick Barkley, St. John's
 Khalid El-Amin, Connecticut
 Albert Mouring, Connecticut
 Lavor Postell, St. John's
 Lee Scruggs, Georgetown
 Bootsy Thornton, St. John's

Television

Local Radio

References
General: 

Tournament
Big East men's basketball tournament
Basketball in New York City
College sports in New York City
Sports competitions in New York City
Sports in Manhattan
Big East men's basketball tournament
Big East men's basketball tournament
2000s in Manhattan
Madison Square Garden